Italian Fast Food is a film directed by Ludovico Gasparini, and written by Carlo and Enrico Vanzina, Lorenzo Beccati and Ezio Greggio.

The film was inspired by the TV show Drive In, a popular 2-hour show of the 1980s.

A few of the characters were actually lifted from the show: Sergio Vastano reprised his desperate student role, while Enzo Braschi gave a three-dimensionality to his Paninaro. Other roles were created for the movie, using actors from the TV show - Carlo Pistarino became a delivery boy, the Trettré were the owner and two workers at the fast food, and Susanna Messaggio (the only actress who was not part of Drive In) became an acting-obsessed waitress.

The movie is about one day in the life of an Italian fast food restaurant, with several of its customers and workers living strange adventures in and around Milan.

During production, Carlo Pistarino had an accident with the vehicle that was used by his character to deliver food, and the actor came out unharmed after flipping over his 3-wheel car.

The role of Missile is played by Matteo Molinari, who was one of the writers on Drive In, who subsequently co-wrote the widely successful book series "Anche le Formiche nel Loro Piccolo S'Incazzano" as well as the American-based series "Oops! Movie Mistakes that Made the Cut", books about movie bloopers.

References

External links

1980s Italian-language films
1986 films
1986 comedy films
Italian comedy films
1980s Italian films